Australia–Romania relations refer to bilateral relations between Australia and Romania. Australia is represented through its embassy in Athens, Greece, and a consulate in Bucharest. In the other hand, Romania has an embassy in Canberra and a consulate in Melbourne and Sydney. Both countries officially established their diplomatic relations on 18 March 1968.

On 23 June 2016, the Minister of Foreign Affairs of Romania Lazăr Comănescu met with John Griffin, ambassador of Australia to Romania, at the embassy in Athens. Comănescu expressed interest in deepening diplomatic relations with Australia and increasing commercial and economic activities between the two countries. He also acknowledged the commitment and cooperation of Australia towards NATO regarding Afghanistan (both countries have deployed troops in the area). Griffin affirmed the interest of the Australian authorities for the same.

On 8 October 2018, Teodor Meleșcanu, Romanian Minister of Foreign Affairs, met with the Australian Senator Ian Macdonald. Meleșcanu acknowledged the improvement of the diplomatic relations between the two countries, which multiplied their contacts several times in recent years. He also noted the 50th anniversary of diplomatic relations and the possibilities for further improving relations between both. To celebrate it, an exhibition was organized celebrating the contribution of the Romanian explorers Emil Racoviță and Teodor Negoiță in Antarctica.

See also 
 Foreign relations of Australia
 Foreign relations of Romania
 Romanian Australians

References 

 
Romania
Australia